John Adams Middle School may refer to any of several middle schools in the United States:

 John Adams Middle School, Los Angeles, California
 John Adams Middle School, Santa Monica, California
 John Adams Middle School, Mason City, Iowa; see Mason City High School
 John Q. Adams Middle School, Metarie, Louisiana
 John Adams Middle School, Edison, New Jersey
 John Adams Middle School, Albuquerque, New Mexico
 John Adams Middle School, Charleston, West Virginia

In Fiction:
 John Adams Middle School in a Chicago metropolitan area suburb in the movie Bad Teacher